The Armeno-Georgian War was a short border dispute that was fought in December 1918 between the newly-independent Democratic Republic of Georgia and the First Republic of Armenia, largely over the control of former districts of Tiflis Governorate, in Borchaly (Lori) and Akhalkalaki.

At the end of World War I, Armenia and Georgia had both declared their independence from the Russian Empire. Georgia controlled Lori and Akhalkalaki, both of which were populated primarily by Armenians. The border dispute turned into open military involvement on 7 December 1918. Armenian forces made substantial gains and came within 30 miles of the Georgian capital, Tiflis, when the Allied representatives in the city intervened to demand a ceasefire. Skirmishes continued until the war finally came to an end at midnight on 31 December.

A neutral zone, under Allied supervision, was declared in the Lori and Borchalo provinces, which would later be split in between the two states. The large Armenian population of Tiflis and other Georgian-controlled regions was subject to large arrests and other forms of prosecution both during and after the war. Armenia did not succeed in the nearly-obtained original goal of gaining land up to the Khrami River, and the entire war took place on land that had been controlled prior by Georgia, which had made no territorial gains. The result of the war is considered inconclusive, with the Armenian side declaring a successful liberation of Armenian territories and the Georgian side declaring a successful defense against an invasion.

Background

Russian Revolution

After the February Revolution, the Russian Provisional Government installed the Special Transcaucasian Committee to govern the area. However, after the October Revolution, the Special Transcaucasian Committee was replaced on 11 November 1917 by the Transcaucasian Commissariat, centred in Tbilisi. The Commissariat concluded the Armistice of Erzincan with the Ottoman Empire on 5 December 1917, which ended a localised armed conflict with the Ottoman Empire. The Commissariat actively sought to suppress Bolshevik influence and meanwhile to pursue a path towards Transcaucasian independence from Soviet Russia. That t included establishing a legislative body, the Transcaucasian Sejm to which the Commissariat surrendered its authority on 23 January 1918 after the dispersal of the Russian Constituent Assembly by the Bolsheviks. The secessionist and anti-Bolshevik agenda eventfully brought Transcaucasian into conflict with the central government. On 3 March, the Russians signed the Treaty of Brest-Litovsk, marking Russia's exit from World War I. In the treaty, Russia agreed to return territory gained during the Russo-Turkish War (1877–1878), which gave little care to the fact that the territory was under the effective control of Armenian and Georgian forces. The Trebizond Peace Conference, between the Ottoman Empire and the Sejm, began on 4 March and continued until April. The Ottomans offered to surrender all of their ambitions in the Caucasus in return for recognition of the re-acquisition of the eastern Anatolian provinces awarded at Brest-Litovsk.

 
By then, leading Georgian politicians viewed an alliance with Germany as the only way to prevent Georgia from being occupied by the Ottoman Empire. Consequently, the National Council of Georgia declared the independence of the Democratic Republic of Georgia on 24 May and, two days later, signed the Treaty of Poti with Germany to place itself under German protection. The following day, the Muslim National Council announced the establishment of the Azerbaijan Democratic Republic. Having been largely abandoned by its allies, the Armenian National Council declared independence on May 28. On 4 June, the Ottoman Empire signed the Treaty of Batum with each of the three Transcaucasus states, which brought the conflict with the Ottoman Empire to an end. The treaty awarded the southern half of the ethnically-Armenia Lori Province and Akhalkalaki district to the Ottomans, but it did not firmly delineate the borders between the new Transcaucasus states. In response and to deny the Ottomans a direct route to Tbilisi, Georgian units, supported by German officers, took possession of northern Lori and established outposts along the Dzoraget River.

In the final months of World War I, the Ottoman Empire was poised to invaded both Armenia and Georgia. After the Georgians had signed the Treaty of Poti with Germany for protection, the Ottomans focused solely on Armenia, which defeated the Ottoman invasion at the Battles of Sardarabad and Karakilisa. After the Armistice of Mudros, the Ottomans retreated from the Lori Province, which Georgia laid claimed to and occupied in October 1918. Lori had a population that was 75% Armenian. In November and early December, the Armenians of Lori protested that Georgian troops, under the guise of "conducting investigations", robbed food and supplies from the homes of Armenian peasants and molested women. Similar crimes were committed by Georgian troops against Armenians behind the Georgian border at Akhalkalaki, which had a population that was over 90% Armenian.

Initial clashes

In early October 1918, the Ottomans pulled back from southern Lori, which eliminated the territorial buffer between Armenia and Georgia. The Armenian military quickly filled the void by taking control of much of southern Lori on 18 October and, in the absence of any resistance, probed further north. The first incident between Armenia and Georgia occurred the same day, when an Armenian army detachment seized the railway station in the village of Kober, near Tumanyan, and refused a subsequent demand from the Germans to withdraw. Another village, Korinj, was also seized. The Armenians withdrew when Georgia sent a detachment to confront them, but they later returned to Korinj and occupied Tsater. Armenia's ambassador to Tbilisi, Arshak Djamalian insisted that Armenian claims over Lori were indisputable, but his government wished and amicable solution "in the name of the century's-long brotherly relations of the two peoples". The Georgian government agreed with a peaceful settlement in principal. However, Armenian troops had to leave recently-occupied villages, and further operations within the Tiflis Governorate would be considered an act of war. The commander of the German military expedition reminded Djamalian that Germany was obliged to defend its protectorate. On October 24 the Georgian government declared martial law in Lori, deployed General Tsulukidze and ordered him to deal with armed formations behind Georgian lines. He was, however, instructed to avoid direct confrontation with the Armenian troops, who were occupying Korinj and Tsater. On October 26 the invading Armenian forces were ordered to return and left the two villages amid the deployment of a Georgian contingent in the area.

The historian Christopher J. Walker compared the Georgian occupation of Lori to a "tsarist-style military bureaucracy". The historian Leo wrote:

The Armenian government made attempts to solve the dispute diplomatically on 9 and 12 December, which the Georgian government rejected. On 12 December, Armenian Prime Minister Hovhannes Kajaznuni sent the following message to his Georgian counterpart Noe Zhordania:

Georgia had begun to prevent railroads from transporting foreign supplies into Armenia, which resulted in famine.

Lori region 
Armenian-American historian Richard G. Hovannisian in his book The Republic of Armenia describes the political history of the Lori region:

War

Lori unrest
Following the Turkish retreat from southern Lori in October 1918, Armenian forces gained control of the region, resulting in a border between Armenia and Georgia. In response, the Georgian side bolstered it's garrison in the northern parts. The local populace was required to provide quarters and supplies for Georgian troops and became subject to searches and undisciplined behaviour by the soldiers. In Uzunlar, the Armenian peasantry resisted the excessive search operations. In response, Georgian troops beat the village commissar and killed an official. A Georgian military investigation confirmed the Georgian soldiers had been the instigators and requested replacement of troops, but concluded that due to the organised nature of resistance, Uzunlar was to be searched and neutralized.

By early December, rebellion seemed imminent in northern Lori. Armenian emissaries from Uzunlar traveled to the Georgian headquarters near Sanahin to protest the violence. General Tsulukidze had the emissaries arrested and sent a detachment to deal with the unrests. His troops were reportedly attacked, while the Armenians of Uzunlar claimed their village was bombarded for two days, while the Georgians claimed the villagers had opened fire. According to Tsulikidze, Armenian troops of the 4th Infantry Regiment operating in disguise were instigating an insurrection. They had disarmed a cavalry unit and the garrison at Uzunlar. Subsequently a relief force was met with a barrage of fire. The following day an Armenian force of 350 men attacked two Georgian units and partisans crushed several soldiers by boulders rolled down a mountainside. Tsulukidze was convinced that he dealt with regular Armenian army units because orders were submitted in Russian, which was the language used by the Armenian military command. In his view Sanahin itself was in danger. The Armenian side maintained that they had no regular troops involved until mid-December, when the oppression of the local peasantry had become too severe to continue tolerating. General Goguadze, who was in charge of the armoured trains, informed the Georgian government that rails between Sanahin and Alaverdi had been sabotaged, while Tsulukidze claimed his forces were suppressed by Armenian troops at Alaverdi. The Georgian side accused Armenian villages of harbouring Armenian army units.

Armenian offensive

On 13 December, with peaceful negotiations having failed, the government of Armenia ordered General Drastamat Kanayan to force the Georgian troops out of Lori. Kanayan commanded a force of 28 infantry companies, four cavalry squadrons, including reserves and was equipped with 26 machine guns and seven mountain cannons. Armenia had fewer men, provisions, and ammunition than Georgia, however their troops held the decisive advantage of penetrating into friendly territory, and enjoyed support from the local Armenian population and partisans. Armenian forces quickly made substantial gains. The 4th, 5th, and 6th Regiments advanced in three columns under Colonels Ter-Nikoghosian, Nesterovskii, and Korolkov, towards the line of villages, Vorontsovka-Privolnoye-Opret-Hairum. That afternoon, the Armenians had captured Haghpat, and General Varden Tsulukidze had been forced to evacuate from the Georgian headquarters at Sanahin. By 15 December, the Armenian army captured Vorontsovka, Privolnoye, Sanahin, Mikhayelovka, Alaverdi, and the heights between Haghpat and Akhova. The Georgians had left behind their dead and wounded. The Armenians had already captured almost a hundred Georgian soldiers, as well as many cavalry mounts, fifty freight cars, a locomotive, and several machine guns and mountain cannons.

On 16 December the Armenian left flank, commanded by Ter-Nikoghosian, now advanced from Lori into Georgia proper on Bolnis-Khachen and Katharinenfeld, while Korolov's right flank captured Hairum. The surprise attack at Hairum cost the Georgians another 500 men killed, wounded, or taken prisoner. On 17 December, the Georgian 5th and 6th Infantry Regiments were caught in a pincer movement by the two Armenian offensives and were able to escape, but suffered sixty extra casualties, as well as having to abandon two field guns and twenty five machine guns. The Armenians also captured two fully equipped Georgian armoured trains and Tsulukidze's personal railway coach at the station of Akhtala. Tsulukidze had fled back to Sadakhlu, and by 18 December, the column under Ter-Nikoghosian had taken Bolnis-Khachen. Back in Tiflis, a state of emergency was declared.

Reinforcements of a thousand infantrymen, a cavalry squadron, and their final armoured train were sent by Georgian War Minister Grigol Giorgadze to Sadakhlu on 18 December. Nonetheless, the Armenian right flank continued pursuing the main Georgian force at Sadakhlu, and also captured Shulaver on 20 December. The Armenians had now approached the Khrami River. Other units moved on Sadakhlu, but came under fire within range of the armored train, and sustained their first heavy losses. However, the rails to the Georgian's rear had been cut, and they were in danger of encirclement. On 22 December, the Armenians again attacked Sadakhlu and captured its station and the village outskirts, but were again forced back by the Georgian troops and their armoured train. Kanayan assembled twelve companies for a full-scale offensive. On 23 December, after hours of intense fighting, the Armenians occupied the strategic village. The Armenians took 132 Georgian POWs, over a hundred freight cars of food and munitions, 2 machine guns, and 3 trains. Casualties on the Armenian side were 7 killed and 11 wounded.

After the capture of Sadakhlu, Tsulukidze was relieved of his command and replaced by Major General Giorgi Mazniashvili. The Armenian army was now within 30 miles of the Georgian capital Tiflis. Armenian forces continued to advance on 24 December, but the next day the Georgians were reinforced by 1,000 new troops and airplanes, which bombed Shulaver. On 25 December, the Allied delegations in Tiflis had intervened to demand the war come to an end.

Allied intervention
An Allied military commission led by Lieutenant Colonels R. P. Jordan (Britain) and P. A. Chardigny (France) had been stationed in Tiflis. Georgian Foreign Minister Evgeni Gegechkori had appealed to them for intervention on 15 December. Jordan suggested all Armenian and Georgian forces withdraw from the disputed territory, which would be policed by British troops until its status was decided at the Paris Peace Conference. Gegechkori was in favor of a status quo ante bellum.

The Armenian representatives in Tiflis were not included in these early negotiations. The British and French had only messaged Premier Kajaznuni by 25 December, when diplomat Arshak Jamalyan was sent to negotiate. Jamalyan protested this one-sided treatment and objected to the annexation of any territories the Armenians controlled. The Allies wired a decision to Yerevan on 25 December. By this time, all of Lori and much of Borchalu had been controlled by Kanayan's forces:

The decision was signed by Rycroft, Chardigny, and Zhordania, who called on both Armenian and Georgian military leaders to cease their activities. The Allies decided to impose the plan with or without the approval of the government of Armenia. Armenian officials decided to agree to the truce, on the condition that they be allowed to send a delegation to Tiflis to resolve any ambiguities in the settlement. A ceasefire was to take place on 31 December 1918.

Final clashes

Both sides attempted to maintain favorable positions before the ceasefire came into effect. The Armenian soldiers had marched for two weeks without rest. No reinforcements could be sent by the government. The supplies of Armenian troops now mostly consisted of bread and munitions captured from the Georgians. An outbreak of typhus had also occurred. Conversely, the Georgians were able to quickly send reinforcements and plan operations now that hostilities were so close to Tiflis.

Several skirmishes took place from 25 to 27 December. Though the Georgian efforts had become more brazen, positions changed little during these days. On 28 December, the Georgians had made a breakthrough when a force of 3,500 instructed by Mazniashvili overtook Shulaver, as well as a number of smaller villages. The Armenians suffered 200 casualties. Over the next two days, the Armenians and Georgians fought over Sadakhlu, which changed hands several times. Eventually the two armies entrenched themselves in a stalemate, with the Armenians in station and Georgians in the town.

The final confrontations took place on 31 December, before the ceasefire would come into effect at midnight. The Armenians made strategic gains at their center and right columns, but the typhus-infected left column was pushed back. Late in the afternoon, Armenian soldiers outflanked the Georgians and took the eastern heights of Sadakhlu. In addition, the Armenians had also cut the railway leading Shulaver in Mamai. At the end of the day, both armies were situated along irregular lines. The north, south, and east of Sadakhlu were controlled by the Armenians, while the Georgians had advanced a considerable distance southwest of the village.

Persecution of Armenians in Georgia
Throughout the war, Armenians in Georgia were heavily persecuted, and many were arrested without cause. Several organisations were shut down, including charities for refugees and orphans. Armenian newspapers were banned, and members of the Tiflis City Council with Armenian background were arrested. The governor of Tiflis proclaimed that every Armenian civilian was a technical prisoner-of-war. Many of the arrested Armenians were extorted and threatened with execution if they refused. Ransom prices varied between 50 to 50,000 rubles. Even after the ceasefire had been declared, thousands of arrests were made on 5 January 1919.

In January 1919, hundreds of arrested Armenian civilians were marched to Kutaisi, where they were paraded as prisoners-of-war. Georgia had actually captured few Armenian soldiers during the war. The parades were meant to prove the Georgian government's official narrative of the war as being an astonishing Georgian victory.

The persecutions were even more severe in villages outside Tiflis. In the village of Bolnis-Khachen, Georgian militias committed several acts of murder, rape and looting. Armenian peasants had been robbed of grain, crops, fabrics, livestock and various other possessions. Several homes were also destroyed. In Belyi-Kliuch, Georgian soldiers went to an orphanage demanding women. After not finding any, the Georgians instead raped prepubescent girls. They returned to the same orphanage a few days later to commit more rapes. Appeals were made to the Georgian authorities, which went ignored.

Aftermath and assessment

The Allied, Georgian and Armenian officials met to discuss a final settlement from 9 to 17 January 1919. Diplomatic and trade relations were resumed between the two republics. Prisoners were also returned on 23 January. The British created a neutral zone, centred in the Borchaly uezd and reaching from Sadakhlu to the prewar border with Armenia. A commissioner general, eventually decided to be Captain A. S. G. Douglas, would administer the zone and have ultimate authority on the number of Armenian and Georgian troops stationed within it. The neutral zone was split into the districts of Uzunlar, Vorontsoka, and Alaverdi. There were 41–43 villages within the neutral zone with large Armenian populations.

Consequently, the war had caused Allied perception of both Armenia and Georgia to become more negative. Many argued that independence for the Transcaucasian states would result in conflict and instability for the region. That proved to be a critical time, as their fates would be decided at the Paris Peace Conference a few weeks after the ceasefire.

The outcome of the war is disputed. Both the Armenians and Georgians claimed victory. Both sides also felt that they would have had a decisive victory if it had not been for the ceasefire imposed by the Allies. The Armenians had succeeded in forcing the Georgians out of northern Lori, which became a neutral zone eventually split between the two republics. However, their goal had been to seize land up to the Khrami River. The Armenians had advanced during most of the war. Although the Georgians began a counterattack in the final days, they reached a stalemate before the ceasefire. However, the war took place entirely in lands formerly controlled by Georgia. The Armenian army also suffered fewer casualties. The historian Richard G. Hovannisian suggests that the result of the conflict was inconclusive.

In Soviet historiography, the war is portrayed as being instigated by "Entente imperialists" and that the Lori neutral zone was commanded by "British imperialists" and "Georgian Mensheviks".

See also
 Armenian–Azerbaijani War
 Armenia–Georgia border
 Armenia–Georgia relations

References

Sources

Conflicts in 1918
Wars involving Armenia
Wars involving Georgia (country)
Russian Civil War
1918 in Armenia
Democratic Republic of Georgia
First Republic of Armenia
Armenia–Georgia (country) relations
1918 in Georgia (country)